Buzi is the father of Ezekiel the priest in the Hebrew Bible.

People 
 Bu Shang, also known as Buzi (Master Bu)
 Buzi, a character in the Final Fantasy Legend III video game

Places 
 Buzi, Iran (disambiguation), multiple places in Iran
 Búzi, a town in Mozambique
 Buzi District, a district in Mozambique
 Buzi River (Mozambique)
 Buzi River (Taiwan)
 Buzi, an island in the Comoros

Others 
 Buzi (fortification), a type of fortification in China
 Bŭzi, a mandarin square or rank badge worn by scholar-bureaucrats in the Chinese, Korean, and Vietnamese imperial/royal courts